Park Seong-won (born 18 January 1972) is a South Korean breaststroke swimmer. She competed in three events at the 1988 Summer Olympics.

References

External links
 

1972 births
Living people
South Korean female breaststroke swimmers
Olympic swimmers of South Korea
Swimmers at the 1988 Summer Olympics
Asian Games medalists in swimming
Asian Games bronze medalists for South Korea
Swimmers at the 1986 Asian Games
Swimmers at the 1990 Asian Games
Medalists at the 1986 Asian Games
Medalists at the 1990 Asian Games
Place of birth missing (living people)